Patrick Joseph Walker (born 20 December 1959) is an Irish former professional footballer.

Playing career
He played for Gillingham between 1977 and 1981, making 51 appearances in the Football League. He also briefly played for Bohemians, before quitting the professional game and moving to Sweden.

International career
Walker earned two caps for the Republic of Ireland U21 side.

Coaching career
Walker was coach of Varbergs BoIS, GIF Sundsvall between 2000 and 2004 and brought them to their highest league finish in the Allsvenskan to date. In 2005, he took over as manager of Örebro SK and helped them gain promotion to the Allsvenskan, before moving to Norway and Norwegian First Division club Sandefjord Fotball. He guided Sandefjord to their best league finish in the history of the club in 2010.

On 9 May 2011 he was fired from Sandefjord Fotball after a weak season opening, which included one win, two draws and two defeats in the first five matches.

In April 2016 he took over Pars FC Örebro as chairman and renamed the team to Scandinavian Football Club Örebro in order to make the team more professional and attract more players from around the world.

Personal life
He is the father of footballers Kevin and Robert.

References

1959 births
Living people
Sportspeople from County Carlow
Republic of Ireland association footballers
Republic of Ireland expatriate association footballers
Gillingham F.C. players
English Football League players
League of Ireland players
Allsvenskan players
Bohemian F.C. players
Expatriate footballers in Sweden
Republic of Ireland football managers
Republic of Ireland expatriate football managers
Republic of Ireland under-21 international footballers
Kalmar FF managers
Sandefjord Fotball managers
Örebro SK managers
GIF Sundsvall managers
Irish expatriate sportspeople in Norway
Expatriate football managers in Norway
Expatriate football managers in Sweden
Association football fullbacks
Irish expatriate sportspeople in Sweden
Association football midfielders
Oulun Työväen Palloilijat players